The 2003 Giro del Trentino was the 27th edition of the Tour of the Alps cycle race and was held on 24 April to 27 April 2003. The race started and finished in Arco. The race was won by Gilberto Simoni.

General classification

References

2003
2003 in road cycling
2003 in Italian sport